The Amsterdam Tournament  is a pre-season football tournament held for club teams from around the world, hosted at the Amsterdam ArenA. The 2004 tournament was contested by Ajax, Arsenal, Panathinaikos and River Plate on 30 July and 1 August 2004. Ajax won the tournament for the fourth year in a row.

Table

NB: An extra point is awarded for each goal scored.

Matches

Day 1

Day 2

References

2004 
2004–05 in Dutch football
2004–05 in Argentine football
2004–05 in Greek football
2004–05 in English football

it:Torneo di Amsterdam#2004